George M. Harmon, born in Brookfield, Massachusetts on December 2, 1837, was the twenty second Adjutant General of the State of Connecticut. After the war he resumed the manufacture of corsets under the firm name of Foy&Harmon. The firm grew to be one of the largest in putting out corset material having branches in New York and Boston. He afterwards had a commission business in Boston, which was one of the largest in the world in marketing materials for the making of corsets. In 1873 and 1874 Harmon was police commissioner in the city of New Haven. In 1880 he was chairman of the republic state committee. Harmon was a member of the Military Order of the Loyal Legion of the United States for New York and had membership in a number of organizations in that state.

Military career
In 1861, at the start of the Civil War, Harmon enlisted in the Fourth Connecticut Infantry, which afterwards became a part of the First Connecticut Heavy Artillery, and rose from a lieutenant to a captain. He participated in the battles of Yorktown, Hanover, Court House, Gaine Mills, and Malvern Hill. In 1881 Captain Harmon was made Connecticut Adjutant General 1881-1882 by Governor Bigelow.

Personal life
Harmon got married twice. His second wife was Mary Ann Baldwin (1834-1904), and they had four sons and one daughter; Mary L. Harmon (1860-1887), George H. Harmon (1862-1882), William Charles Harmon Sr. (1869-1943), Frank W. Harmon (1871), and Edward F. Harmon (1874-1919).  Harmon died on November 21, 1910, in New Haven, Connecticut.

References

Military personnel from Connecticut
Connecticut Adjutant Generals
1837 births
1910 deaths